Audun Rusten (11 June 1894 – 14 December 1957) was a Norwegian swimmer. He competed in the men's 200 metre breaststroke event at the 1912 Summer Olympics.

References

External links
 

1894 births
1957 deaths
Norwegian male breaststroke swimmers
Olympic swimmers of Norway
Swimmers at the 1912 Summer Olympics
Sportspeople from Bergen
20th-century Norwegian people